The Krka Bridge is located in Croatia, between the Skradin and Šibenik interchanges. It carries the A1 motorway route south of Skradin, in immediate vicinity of Krka National Park.

Composite spandrel structure consists of steel girders and reinforced concrete deck slab. Immediately to the south of the bridge, there is Krka rest area offering a scenic view of the bridge and the river canyon.

The construction works comprised 16,000 cubic meters of excavation, 2,000 cubic meters of embankments and backfill, 11,800 cubic meters of various types of concrete and 2,300 tons of reinforcement steel. That does not include additional 1,700 tons of steel used for execution of the spandrel structure.

The Krka Bridge comprises the longest span of all the bridges on the A1 motorway, as its span surpasses the Maslenica Bridge by mere .

Traffic volume
Traffic is regularly counted and reported by Hrvatske autoceste, operator of the bridge and the A1 motorway where the bridge is located, and published by Hrvatske ceste. Substantial variations between annual (AADT) and summer (ASDT) traffic volumes are attributed to the fact that the bridge carries substantial tourist traffic to the Dalmatian Adriatic resorts. The traffic count is performed using analysis of motorway toll ticket sales.

See also
A1 motorway
List of arch bridges by length
List of bridges by length

References

Deck arch bridges
Bridges completed in 2004
Toll bridges in Croatia
Concrete bridges
Buildings and structures in Šibenik-Knin County